Cornick is a Filipino deep-fried crunchy puffed corn nut snack. It is most commonly garlic-flavored but can also come in a variety of other flavors. It is traditionally made with glutinous corn.

Description
Cornick is made by soaking corn kernels in water for three days, changing the water used for soaking daily. The corn used is traditionally glutinous corn (mais malagkit or mais pilit), but other types of corn can also be used, including popcorn. After soaking, the kernels are drained and dried thoroughly. It is cooked for around two to three minutes then drained on paper towels. 

Cornick is traditionally seasoned with salt and toasted garlic. Commercial variants come in a larger aray of flavors including adobo, chili, cheese, and barbecue flavors.

Variations
Chichacorn, a portmanteau of "chicharron" and "corn", is a variant of cornick originating from the Ilocos region. It differs from cornick in that it is allowed to partially pop during frying.

Commercial versions
Mass-produced cornick snacks are widespread in the Philippines. The most popular commercial brands include Boy Bawang, Super Bawang, Bawang na Bawang, and Safari. It is also a common ingredient in Filipino mixed nuts snacks which include brands like Ding Dong and Corn Bits.

See also

Binatog
Ampaw
Pinipig
List of maize dishes

References

Maize products
Philippine snack food